This is a list of Young England women One Day International (ODI) cricketers. Overall, 14 women played in at least one women's one-day international for Young England. A One Day International, or an ODI, is an international cricket match between two representative teams, each having ODI status. An ODI differs from Test matches in that the number of overs per team is limited, and that each team has only one innings. The list is arranged in the order in which each player won her first ODI cap. Where more than one player won her first ODI cap in the same match, those players are listed alphabetically by surname.

All six of Young England women's ODI matches were played during the 1973 Women's Cricket World Cup.

Key

General
*: an innings that ended not out
Mat: number of matches played
Batting
Inn: number of innings
NO: number of times an innings ends not out
Runs: number of runs scored by batsman/off bowler's bowling
HS: highest score
Avg: batting average
100/50: number of centuries and half-centuries scored

Bowling
Overs: number of overs bowled
Mdn: number of maiden overs (overs off which no runs were scored)
Wkt: number of wickets taken
BB: best bowling figures
Avg: bowling average
5wI: number of times 5 wickets were taken in an innings
Fielding
Ca: number of catches taken
St: number of stumpings made

Players
All six of Young England women's ODI matches were played during the 1973 Women's Cricket World Cup. This list is arranged in the order in which each player won her first ODI cap.

Notes

References

Young England women ODI
 
Cricket
Young England wonmen
Cricket